Hookstown is a borough in western Beaver County, Pennsylvania, United States. The population was 130 at the 2020 census. It is a part of the Pittsburgh metropolitan area.

History
Hookstown is named after Matthias Hook, early pioneer and Revolutionary War soldier, and his family. The only known surviving relatives are the McCormick family, who still reside in Hookstown and surrounding areas in western Pennsylvania.

Through his daughter, Catherine Hook, who married George Griffey, there are many who can trace their roots back to Mathias living throughout the country.  There has been a Griffey reunion held annually for more than a hundred years every June in West Springfield, Pennsylvania.

Hookstown was the birthplace of Robert Justice.

In 1975, Little Blue Run Lake, the U.S.'s largest coal slurry waste impound, was built directly west of the town and has caused environmental damage to the surrounding communities.

Geography
Hookstown is located in western Beaver County at  (40.598869, -80.474150). Pennsylvania Route 168 runs through the community, leading northeastward  to the Ohio River borough of Shippingport and south  to U.S. Route 30, the Lincoln Highway.

Surrounding neighborhoods
Hookstown is entirely surrounded in the center of Greene Township

Demographics

As of the census of 2000, there were 152 people, 66 households, and 48 families residing in the borough. The population density was 1,279.5 people per square mile (489.1/km²). There were 72 housing units at an average density of 606.1 per square mile (231.7/km²). The racial makeup of the borough was 97.37% White, 0.66% Native American, 0.66% Asian, and 1.32% from two or more races. Hispanic or Latino of any race were 0.66% of the population.

There were 66 households, out of which 21.2% had children under the age of 18 living with them, 56.1% were married couples living together, 10.6% had a female householder with no husband present, and 25.8% were non-families. 24.2% of all households were made up of individuals, and 12.1% had someone living alone who was 65 years of age or older. The average household size was 2.30 and the average family size was 2.65.

In the borough the population was spread out, with 16.4% under the age of 18, 4.6% from 18 to 24, 21.7% from 25 to 44, 32.2% from 45 to 64, and 25.0% who were 65 years of age or older. The median age was 50 years. For every 100 females, there were 81.0 males. For every 100 females age 18 and over, there were 84.1 males.

The median income for a household in the borough was $27,500, and the median income for a family was $40,208. Males had a median income of $47,969 versus $25,000 for females. The per capita income for the borough was $16,499. About 4.3% of families and 6.6% of the population were below the poverty line, including 5.3% of those under the age of eighteen and 7.9% of those sixty five or over.

Education
Children in Hookstown are served by the South Side Area School District. The current schools serving Hookstown are:
 South Side Elementary School –  grades K-5
 South Side Middle School – grades 6-8
 South Side High School – grades 9-12

References

 

Populated places established in 1797
Pittsburgh metropolitan area
Boroughs in Beaver County, Pennsylvania